Dvali is a Georgian surname. Notable people with the surname include:

Giorgi Dvali (born 1964), Georgian professor of physics and a director at the Max Planck Institute for Physics
Jaba Dvali (born 1985), Georgian football player for Dacia Chișinău
Lasha Dvali (born 1995), Georgian football player for Śląsk Wrocław

Surnames of Georgian origin
Georgian-language surnames